Gbin (Gbĩ) is an extinct Mande language of Ivory Coast, neighboring but not closely related to Beng. The only significant attestation is Delafosse (1904). Paperno describes Beng and Gbin as two primary branches of Southern Mande.

References

Mande languages
Languages of Ivory Coast

sw:Kibeng
pms:Lenga Beng